Midland International can refer to:

 Midland International Airport, an airport in Texas
 Midland International Records, a record label

See also
 British Midland International (BMI), an airline